Spiewak or Śpiewak is a Polish-language surname, which literally means "singer". It is found across Poland, particularly in central and southern regions. It is related to the Ukrainian surname Spivak. Spiewak may refer to:

Kacper Śpiewak (born 2000), Polish footballer
Paweł Śpiewak (born 1951), Polish sociologist and politician
Wiesław Śpiewak (born 1963), Polish-born Roman Catholic prelate in Bermuda
Włodzimierz Śpiewak (1938–1997), Polish footballer
Jason Spiewak, a founder of Rock Ridge Music
A short common name for I. Spiewak & Sons
A brand name for police uniforms by I. Spiewak & Sons

See also

References

Occupational surnames
Polish-language surnames